Louis Halbourg (10 May 1910 – 5 March 1973) was a French racing cyclist. He rode in the 1935 Tour de France.

References

1910 births
1973 deaths
French male cyclists
Place of birth missing